Helena was a China packet built by William H. Webb in 1841. Helena is often called a "pre-clipper" or "early clipper ship", type of the fast ships that were a precursor to the fast clippers that dominated the China trade routes for years to follow.

History
Helena was owned by N. L. and G. Griswold and sailed in the China trade under the command of Captain Deliverance P. Benjamin.

Passages
In 1841, Helena commanded by Captain Deliverance P. Benjamin made an 83-day passage from New York to Valparaiso, Chile in 83 days. Helena made two long stop in Chile and then in Lima, Peru, before sailing to China. She docked at Macao on June 15, 1842 after 68 at sea. She rested in Macao until September 2, 1842, when she sailed to New York in less than 106 days, arriving there on December 21, 1842.

In 1843, Helena made a record by sailing from Valparaiso, Chile to Canton, China in 51 days. She returned to New York the following year from Canton in 90 days.

In 1846, Helena sailed from New York to Java in just 73 days and 20 hours, averaging 183 miles a day.

Final Fate
She was lost at sea in 1857 under command of Captain Thompson on her passage from China to Havana.

References

1841 ships
Merchant ships of the United States
Lost sailing vessels
Maritime incidents in 1857